Formosa is a common surname in Malta, Spain, Portugal, Spanish colonies and other Mediterranean countries. 

The name derives from the Latin name Formosus and Spanish word "fermoso", meaning "beautiful".

Formosa, as the island of Taiwan was formerly known in the West, has the same linguistic origin - from the Portuguese Ilha Formosa, "beautiful island".

People with the surname
Andreas Formosa, Cypriot actor 
Carlo Formosa (1963 - ), Italian diplomat, first ambassador of Italy to ONU
Gil Formosa, French cartoonist and an illustrator
Henry Formosa, Canadian politician of Maltese origin
Joann Formosa, Australian Para-equestrian
John Formosa, Maltese theologian, canonist, minor philosopher, and poet
Luis Manresa Formosa (1915-2010), Guatemalan prelate of Roman Catholic Society of Jesus
Noel Formosa was the mayor of St. Lawrence
Ric Formosa, Australian composer and musician
 David Formosa, current mayor of Powell River, British Columbia

External links
http://www.searchmalta.com/surnames/formosa/FORMOSA.doc

References

Surnames